USS Pasco (PG-114/PF-6), a  patrol frigate in commission from 1944 to 1945, has thus far been the only ship of the United States Navy to be named for Pasco, Washington. She later served in the Soviet Navy as EK-12 and in the Japan Maritime Self-Defense Force as JDS Kashi (PF-3/PF-283) and as YAC-12.

Construction and commissioning
Originally classified as a patrol gunboat, PG-114, Pasco was reclassified as a patrol frigate, PF-6, on 15 April 1943. She was laid down under Maritime Commission (MARCOM) contract, as MC Hull 1424, on 7 July 1943, by the Permanente Metals Richmond Shipyard#4, Richmond, California. Launched on 17 August 1943, sponsored by Miss Myrna Olson, the ship was commissioned on 15 April 1944. Her first commanding officer was Commander Roy E. Stockstill, USCGR, who was succeeded on 26 April 1945, by Lieutenant Olaz Laveson, USCGR.

Service history

U.S. Navy, World War II, 1944–1945
After shakedown, Pasco reported to San Francisco, California, on 25 May 1944, and conducted patrol operations in the San Francisco-San Diego, California, area until reporting to Kodiak, Territory of Alaska, to serve in the Alaskan Sea Frontier on 15 October 1944.  In January 1945, she steamed to Seattle, Washington, and conducted defensive patrols off the coast of the Pacific Northwest.

Selected for transfer to the Soviet Navy in Project Hula – a secret program for the transfer of US Navy ships to the Soviet Navy at Cold Bay, Alaska, in anticipation of the Soviet Union joining the war against Japan – Pasco proceeded to Cold Bay, in the summer of 1945, and began training her new Soviet crew.

Soviet Navy, 1945–1949
Commissioned into the Soviet Navy immediately, Pasco was designated as a storozhevoi korabl ("escort ship") and renamed EK-12 in Soviet service. She soon departed Cold Bay, bound for Petropavlovsk-Kamchatsky in the Soviet Union, where she served as a patrol vessel in the Soviet Far East.

In February 1946, the United States began negotiations for the return of ships loaned to the Soviet Union for use during World War II. On 8 May 1947, United States Secretary of the Navy James V. Forrestal informed the United States Department of State that the United States Department of the Navy wanted 480 of the 585 combatant ships it had transferred to the Soviet Union for World War II use returned, EK-12 among them. Negotiations for the return of the ships were protracted, but on 16 October 1949 the Soviet Union finally returned EK-12 to the US Navy at Yokosuka, Japan.

Japan Maritime Self-Defense Force, 1953–1968

Kashi was redesignated PF-283 on 1 September 1957. The United States struck the ship from the Naval Vessel Register on 1 December 1961, and transferred her to Japan outright in 1964. Kashi was decommissioned on 30 June 1967, reclassified as an "auxiliary stock craft" (YAC), and renamed YAC-12. She was returned to US custody on 18 March 1968.

Republic of Korea Navy, 1969
The United States transferred the ship to South Korea in 1969, and the Republic of Korea Navy cannibalized her for spare parts for its other Tacoma-class patrol frigates. In April 1969, the ship was converted to a floating pier. Her final disposition is unknown.

Notes

References

Bibliography

External links 
 
 hazegray.org: USS Pasco

 

Tacoma-class frigates
Ships built in Richmond, California
1943 ships
World War II frigates and destroyer escorts of the United States
Tacoma-class frigates of the Soviet Navy
World War II frigates of the Soviet Union
Cold War frigates of the Soviet Union
Tacoma-class frigates of the Japan Maritime Self-Defense Force
Tacoma-class frigates of the Republic of Korea Navy
Ships transferred under Project Hula